Apatar is an open source ETL (Extract-Transform-Load) and data integration software application.

History
Apatar open source project was founded in 2005. The first version of the tool was released under the GPLv2 license at www.sourceforge.net in February 2007. In April 2007, Apatar alpha version was demonstrated to its strategic partners, including MySQL and BlackDuck. Apatar, Inc., a commercial company that provides support for the Apatar open source software, was founded in 2007  as a branch of Altoros.

Products
The company’s main product is Apatar, a cross-platform open source desktop data integration tool that provides connectivity to a variety of databases, applications, protocols, files, and many more.

Users and customers
Apatar’s user and customer base ranges from small companies and individuals to large organizations such as the World Bank Group, Thomson Reuters, John Wiley & Sons, R.R. Donnelley, Autodesk,.  and more.

References

External links
Apatar Web site
Apatar project page on SourceForge.Net
Apatar Community Web site
Apatar Overview Demo

Software companies of Belarus
Companies based in Los Angeles County, California
Extract, transform, load tools
Data warehousing products
Free software companies
Enterprise application integration